Lahijan Rural District is in the Central District of Piranshahr County, West Azerbaijan province, Iran. At the National Census of 2006, its population was 5,509 in 886 households. There were 5,481 inhabitants in 1,158 households at the following census of 2011. At the most recent census of 2016, the population of the rural district was 5,183 in 1,246 households. The largest of its 17 villages was Darbekeh, with 2,007 people.

References 

Piranshahr County

Rural Districts of West Azerbaijan Province

Populated places in West Azerbaijan Province

Populated places in Piranshahr County